Stanstead Lock (No4) is a lock on the River Lee Navigation close to the villages of Stanstead Abbotts and St Margarets. The lock which incorporates a rare example of a swing-bridge, has the reputation of being one of the country's most difficult to negotiate.

Location

The lock-keeper's house is located on an island formed by a section of the River Lee Flood Relief Channel that flows through the automatic sluice gate adjacent to the lock.

Located to the south of the lock is the Stanstead marina.

Public transport 
St Margarets (Hertfordshire) railway station

External links
 Stanstead marina
 Stanstead Lock - a history

References

Locks of the Lee Navigation
Locks in Hertfordshire
Great Amwell